Nanpi is a county in the east of Hebei province, China, bordering Shandong province to the south. It is under the administration of the prefecture-level city of Cangzhou.

Administrative divisions
There are 6 towns and 3 townships under the county's administration.

Towns:
Nanpi, Fengjiakou, Zhaizi, Baoguantun, Wangsi, Wumaying

Townships:
Dalangdian Township, Liubali Township, Luguan Township

History:
Nanpi in the history has been pretty famous due to its mention in the epic novel "Heroes in the marsh" 水滸傳 in Ming Dynasty. At that time the town was named Da Ming Fu 大名府. It is also the home town of an important figure in late Qing Dynasty: Zhang ZhiDong 張之洞, who has been a governor to Hunan, Hubei, etc.

Climate

References

External links

County-level divisions of Hebei
Cangzhou